Cheshmeh Munes (also Romanized as Cheshmeh Mūnes) is a village in Sang Bast Rural District, in the Central District of Fariman County, Razavi Khorasan Province, Iran. At the 2006 census, its population was 21, in 6 families.

References 

Populated places in Fariman County